Metin Kaşıkoğlu (born 3 January 1966, Düzce) is a Turkish jurist and politician and a former member of the Grand National Assembly of Turkey for the Justice and Development Party (AKP). He is a co-founder of the Democracy and Progress Party (DEVA).

Early life and education 
He studied law at the Istanbul University following which he worked as an independent lawyer. In his early political career, he became a Member of the Municipal Council of Dücze.

Political career 
As the head of the AKP of Düzce, he supported the Mehmet Keleş during his successful candidacy to the mayorship of Düzce in 2014. He was elected to the Grand National Assembly representing the AKP for Düzce in 2002 and 2007.  In January 2021 he was made a member of the Dispute Resolution Board of the DEVA party led by Ali Babacan. In reaction to the People's Democratic Party's (HDP) acknowledgement of the Armenian genocide he wished the party their extinction as well.

Personal life 
Kaşıkoğlu is married and has three children.

References 

Turkish jurists
1966 births
Justice and Development Party (Turkey) politicians
Istanbul University Faculty of Law alumni
People from Düzce
Democracy and Progress Party politicians
Living people